Bukit Merah Bus Interchange is a bus interchange located in the Bukit Merah Town Centre, along Bukit Merah Central in Bukit Merah, Singapore. The interchange serves the nearby residential estates of Telok Blangah and Bukit Purmei and also the commercial buildings in Bukit Merah Central. It is the only bus interchange in Singapore that does not have a direct link to an MRT station. However, several services link commuters to nearby MRT stations from the interchange. Services 5, 16 and 851 link the interchange to Tiong Bahru, Service 132 links to Redhill, while Service 176 links to Telok Blangah.

History
The interchange was constructed as part of a scheme to improve bus services in the Telok Blangah area. Operations at the interchange commenced on 28 September 1980, and it was officially opened on 14 February 1981, with Minister without Portfolio Lim Chee Onn attending the ceremony.

Bus Contracting Model

Under the new bus contracting model, all the bus routes buses were split into 6 route packages - 167 under Sembawang-Yishun, 176 under Choa Chu Kang-Bukit Panjang, 851 under Seletar, 132 and 153 under Sengkang-Hougang, 139 under Bishan-Toa Payoh and the rest are under Bukit Merah Bus Packages.

References

External links
 Interchanges and Terminals (SBS Transit)
 Interchange/Terminal (SMRT Buses)

Bus stations in Singapore
Bukit Merah
Buildings and structures in Central Region, Singapore